The Carabao mango, also known as the Philippine mango or Manila mango, is a variety of particularly sweet mango from the Philippines. It is one of the most important varieties of mango cultivated in the Philippines. The variety is reputed internationally due to its sweetness and exotic taste. The mango variety was listed as the sweetest in the world by the 1995 edition of the Guinness Book of World Records. It is named after the carabao, the national animal of the Philippines and a native Filipino breed of domesticated water buffalo.

These fruits are kidney-shaped and can range from being short to elongated. When ripe, the fruit is bright yellow tinged with green. The flesh is a rich yellow in color with a tender melting consistency and very aromatic. Like other Southeast Asian-type mangoes, it is polyembryonic (in contrast to Indian-type mangoes). Fruiting season is usually from late May to early July.

There are 14 different strains of Carabao mango. These strains include the Talaban and Fresco of Guimaras, MMSU Gold of the Ilocos Region and Lamao and Sweet Elena of Zambales. A comparative study conducted by Bureau of Agricultural Research of the Department of Agriculture in 2003 found that the Sweet Elena of Zambales is the sweetest Carabao mango strain.

The Mexican Ataulfo and Manilita mango cultivars descended from the Philippine mango through the Manila galleon trade between 1600 and 1800. Both of these cultivars are sometimes referred to as "Manila mangoes" in trade.

See also 
Pico (mango)
Pahutan mango (Mangifera altissima)
Mangga wani (Mangifera caesia)

References

Mango cultivars